The North Carolina militia units were first established in 1775 by the Third North Carolina Provincial Congress on the eve of the American Revolution.  Initially, the militia units were centered on the 35 counties that then existed in the Province of North Carolina.  The units fought against the British, Loyalists, and Cherokee Native Americans that aligned themselves with British forces.  The units included military district brigades established in 1776, county regiments, four battalions, and one independent corps of light horse. Four regiments were located in counties that became part of the Southwest Territory in 1790 and later Tennessee in 1796. The size of brigades could be up to a few thousand volunteers. Brigades were commanded by a brigadier general.   Regiments were commanded by a colonel and made up of a number of companies commanded by captains with about 50 men in each company.  During engagements, one or more companies of regiments may have been involved in actions and commanded by the regimental or brigade commander.  In 1778, Major General John Ashe was selected to command all North Carolina militia and State Troops.  Brigade commanders reported to him.  Separate from the North Carolina militia, the state provided 10 numbered regiments to the Continental Army that were referred to as the North Carolina Line.

Background
In August 1775, the Third North Carolina Provincial Congress of North Carolina delegates appointed Cornelius Harnett the head of the Council of Safety which oversaw resistance to British rule. They also divided the colony into six military districts for the purpose of organizing militia and arranging representation in the executive body of the Council of Safety. At the county level, there were Committees of Safety, including the Rowan, Anson, Mecklenburg, Surry, and Tryon counties.  Many members of these committees of safety became the officers of the regiments of militia.

The North Carolina Provincial Congress authorized 35 existing county militias to be organized on September 9, 1775.  Some counties had already established their militias earlier than 1775.  The Rowan County regiment was split on October 22, 1775 into two distinct regiment, the 1st Rowan County Regiment and the 2nd Rowan County Regiment.  On December 22 that same year, the North Carolina Provincial Council split the Pasquotank County Regiment into two separate and distinct regiments, the 1st and 2nd Pasquotank County regiments.  The two additional regiments brought the total number of county regiments to 37 by the end of 1775.

Units
The following are the North Carolina militia brigades and regiments with their subordination, along with the dates established and disestablished, as well as the original commander when the unit was established by the Provincial Congress.  Many counties started mustering and training militia before the Provincial Congress got around to it, as early as October 1774 (Johnson County Regiment). Regiments were subordinated to named brigades after brigades were established in 1776.  Brigades were headed by a brigadier general and subordinate to the state militia headed by a major general officer, who reported to the Governor of North Carolina.  As new counties were created by the legislature, new regiments were created and some were disbanded.   At the time of the Battle of Kings Mountain in October 1780, there were 50 counties and 51 regiments of militia.  Many regiments had two colonels.  Soldiers and officers from these units were engaged in battles and skirmishes, primarily in North Carolina and South Carolina, but a few engagements were in Georgia, Virginia, and East Florida.  As militia units, the soldiers did not serve full-time and returned home between engagements, musters, and drills.

Notes

References

Bibliography
Despite a requirement by the early government of North Carolina to keep muster roles of the militia, very few of these have survived.  However, efforts of both amateur and professional historians, such as William S. Powell,  William T. Graves, and J.D. Lewis, the composition and history of the North Carolina militia has been reconstructed from thousands of individual records and compiled in reference works such as those listed below. 

 
 
 
 , Volume I – NC Continental Line, 2012, ; Volume II – The Provincial and State Troops(Part 1), ; Volume III – The Provincial and State Troops (Part 2), 
, Vol I: , 2016; Vol II:  ; Vol III: , Vol IV: , Vol V: , Vol VI:

See also
 List of United States militia units in the American Revolutionary War
 List of military leaders in the American Revolutionary War
 List of British units in the American Revolutionary War
 Southern Campaigns: Pension Transactions for a description of the transcription effort by Will Graves
 Southern theater of the American Revolutionary War
 North Carolina Line
 North Carolina State Navy
 Militia (United States)
 Category for North Carolina militiamen in the American Revolution

 American Revolution, Units in
American Revolution-related lists
Military in North Carolina